The Men's 100m Butterfly event at the 2007 Pan American Games took place at the Maria Lenk Aquatic Park in Rio de Janeiro, Brazil on 16 July, 17 July, and 18 July.

Three first round heats were raced, with a total of 20 swimmers.  The fastest 16 swimmers from this group qualified to move on to the semifinals stage.  The 16 swimmers who advanced then raced in two semifinals of eight swimmers each, the results being pooled and the fastest eight swimmers advancing to the final.

Medalists

Records

Results

Notes

References
 Official Site
 Official Results

Butterfly, Men's 100